Maryland's Legislative District 4 is one of 47 districts in the state for the Maryland General Assembly. It covers parts of Frederick County and Carroll County.

Demographic characteristics
As of the 2020 United States census, the district had a population of 141,284, of whom 107,625 (76.2%) were of voting age. The racial makeup of the district was 115,959 (82.1%) White, 5,755 (4.1%) African American, 389 (0.3%) Native American, 5,177 (3.7%) Asian, 85 (0.1%) Pacific Islander, 3,197 (2.3%) from some other race, and 10,736 (7.6%) from two or more races. Hispanic or Latino of any race were 9,166 (6.5%) of the population.

The district had 102,375 registered voters as of October 17, 2020, of whom 23,301 (22.8%) were registered as unaffiliated, 46,243 (45.2%) were registered as Republicans, 31,657 (30.9%) were registered as Democrats, and 455 (0.4%) were registered to other parties.

Political representation
The district is represented for the 2023–2027 legislative term in the State Senate by William Folden (R) and in the House of Delegates by Barrie S. Ciliberti (R), April Fleming Miller (R) and Jesse T. Pippy (R).

References

Frederick County, Maryland
Carroll County, Maryland
04
04